is a 1962 Japanese drama film directed by Kirio Urayama.  It was entered into the 1962 Cannes Film Festival and won the Blue Ribbon Awards in 1962.

Cast
 Sayuri Yoshinaga as Jun
 Mitsuo Hamada as Tsukamoto, Katsumi
 Eijirō Tōno as Ishiguro, Tatsugoro (Jun's father)
 Shoichi Ozawa
 Tokuko Sugiyama as Tomi (Jun's mother)
 Takeshi Katō
 Tanie Kitabayashi
 Akiji Kobayashi as Heisan
 Kin Sugai
 Yoshio Ichikawa
 Taiji Tonoyama
 Kawai Okada as Kaori

References

External links

1962 films
1962 drama films
Japanese black-and-white films
Japanese drama films
1960s Japanese-language films
Films directed by Kirio Urayama
1960s Japanese films